James "Buster" West (31 March 1901 – 19 March 1966) was an American dancer and actor who was a featured performer in vaudeville, the Broadway stage, motion pictures and television. West was known as being one of those performers who was "born in a suitcase", as his father John West and mother were both vaudeville performers and he performed with them as a child.

Career
Buster West achieved success in vaudeville and the legitimate stage as an eccentric dancer, achieving his breakthrough in the Broadway musical revue George White's Scandals of 1926. One of the stars of that show was another eccentric dancer, Tom Patricola, with whom West would star in short comedies made by the Educational Film Corporation of America, one of the lower-tier production companies in the film industry's Poverty Row. Though he made his film debut as himself in a cameo in Broadway After Dark (1924), the bulk of his movie career was spent in shorts made between 1929 and 1938. He made only one more film, in 1949.

West's television career consisted of two appearances as a dancer on The Frank Sinatra Show in 1951, and appeared in single episodes on Alfred Hitchcock Presents and The Lucy Show in the 1960s.

In 1944, he co-starred with Jackie Gleason in the musical Follow the Girls, a smash hit that ran for 888 performances. His next (and last) Broadway appearance was in another smash, The Pajama Game, when he replaced Eddie Foy Jr. in one of the leads.

Personal life
West was married to the acrobatic dancer and film actress Lucille Page, with whom he appeared with in vaudeville in Berdell and Wellington and in the short Moonlight and Melody (1935). Lucille died in 1964, while Buster died in 1966 from brain cancer. He was buried at Forest Lawn Memorial Park (Hollywood Hills)  in the Hollywood Hills neighborhood of Los Angeles, California.

References

External links

Publicity photo of Lucille Page

1901 births
1966 deaths
American male dancers
American male film actors
American male television actors
Vaudeville performers
American male stage actors
Male actors from Pennsylvania
20th-century American male actors
Burials at Forest Lawn Memorial Park (Hollywood Hills)
20th-century American dancers